Philippe Zawieja is a French psychosociologist, essayist and researcher in occupational health at Mines ParisTech, Paris, known for his research on occupational burnout and other forms of fatigue, in particular in health care industry and Alzheimer's care.

Biography
Zawieja graduated from Burgundy School of Business in 1991, and obtained a master's degree in health economics and management from Paris School of Medicine and a Ph.D. in science and engineering of at-risk activities from Mines ParisTech. He also serves as Secretary of the International Scientific and Ethics Council of ORPEA, the European leader in dependency care.

Awards and honors
Zawieja was nominated in 2013 Knight of the Ordre des Palmes académiques (Order of Academic Palms), a French Order of Chivalry for distinguished academics and figures in the world of culture and education.

He was granted in 2014 the René-Joseph Laufer Award  for social preventive health by the Académie des Sciences Morales et Politiques (French Academy of Moral and Political Sciences), part of the Institut de France.

Selected publications
 Zawieja P., edr. . Paris (France): Armand Colin, November 2016. 
 Zawieja P., edr. . Geneva (Switzerland): Droz, September 2016. 
 Zawieja P. . Paris (France): Presses universitaires de France, April 2015. 
 Zawieja P, Guarnieri F, eds. . Paris (France): Le Seuil, February 2014. 
 Zawieja P, Guarnieri F, eds. . Paris (France): Armand Colin, September 2013.

References 

Year of birth missing (living people)
Living people
French psychologists
French sociologists
Alzheimer's disease researchers
French social scientists
French business theorists
Mines Paris - PSL alumni
French male non-fiction writers